The Society of Americanists in Belgium (Société des Américanistes de Belgique; SAB) is an anthropological society in Brussels, Belgium.  It was founded by Henri Lavachery. A partner of University of Louvain (UCLouvain), SAB publishes the journal Bulletin de la Société des Américanistes de Belgique. Its second Congress was held in 2002.

References

External links
 

Learned societies of Belgium
Organisations based in Brussels
Anthropological research institutes